Samsung Gear is a line of wearable computing devices produced by Samsung Electronics. The first device in the series, the Samsung Galaxy Gear smartwatch, was announced in 2013. Since then, the line has expanded to include fitness bands and earbuds, as well as more smartwatches.

In February 2019, Samsung re-branded smartwatches, fitness bands, and earbuds under the Samsung Galaxy brand. Samsung shipped approximately 31 million wearable devices in 2019, including 7.4 million true wireless earbuds.

Watches

Fitness bands

Earbuds

Other devices 
 Samsung Gear VR – Virtual reality device
 Samsung Gear 360 – 360-degree video camera
 Samsung Gear Circle – Smart neck band

References 

Consumer electronics brands
Gear
Wearable devices